Pauljensenia hongkongensis is a Gram-positive, strictly anaerobic and non-spore-forming species of bacteria from the family Actinomycetaceae.

References

Actinomycetales
Monotypic bacteria genera
Bacteria described in 2018